was the 11th Chief Justice of Japan (1985–1990). He was graduate of Kyoto University. He was a recipient of the Order of the Rising Sun with Paulownia flowers.

Honours
Junior Second Rank (July 25, 2006; posthumous)

Bibliography
朝日新聞「孤高の王国」取材班『孤高の王国裁判所』（朝日文庫、1994年） 、単行本（朝日新聞社、1991年）
山本祐司『最高裁物語（上・下）』（日本評論社、1994年）（講談社+α文庫、1997年）  

1920 births
2006 deaths
Chief justices of Japan
Recipients of the Order of the Rising Sun with Paulownia Flowers
Kyoto University alumni
People from Kyoto